The Industrial Policy Framework for the State of Telangana recognizes that Industrialization is recognized as a key source of the economic growth and development of the Indian state of Telangana. This framework came into force on 1 December 2014.

Vision

The stated vision for industrialization is: "Research to Innovation, Innovation to Industry and Industry to prosperity." The policy encompasses fourteen thrust areas with a plan to develop six industrial corridors and common infrastructure. The cornerstone to the policy is zero graft and zero corruption - in pursuit of a secure and progressive business environment. While large companies such as ITC, Tata Motors and Mahindra are planning to expand their business in the newly developed state(s), this policy has also gained significance in the investment community.

History

On 5 May 2011 the Andhra Pradesh administration introduced guidelines to drive industrial promotion in the state. This policy was successful in attracting corporations such as PEPSI and the Siri City project. This also boosted the growth of the service sector in Hyderabad, transforming it into anIT logistics hub. After bifurcation, both states sought investments that could increase employment and standard living. Telangana's policy framework was introduced on 27 November 2014 and came into effect on 1 December 2014. Telangana govt sets a record with new industrial policy and clears 17 projects worth Rs 1500 crore within 15 days of the launch.

Core values
 Facilitate industrial growth
 Increase employment rates.
 Inclusively facilitate social equality
 Marginally effect the socially disadvantaged sections

Minimum inspection and maximum facilitation 

Each industrial unit is to be inspected once every nine months; as established in advance. Occasional random inspections may occur with written permission of the department manager. Maximum facilitation encompasses an effective system beyond a single window anchor. Self-certification and automatic renewal will be encouraged along with an online E-Help line system.

Single window mechanism 
Main article: TS-iPASS

The industrial clearance system shall be beyond a single window system, and shall be called Telangana State Industrial Project Approval and Self-Certification System (TS-iPASS). This operates at three levels: very large projects, large industries and SMEs.

Thrust areas

Core Sectors Include:

 Life Sciences
 IT hardware including bio-medical devices, electronics, and cellular communication
 Precision engineering including aviation and aerospace 
 Food processing
 Automobiles, tractors and farm equipment
 Textiles and apparels
 Plastics and polymers
 Fast-moving consumer goods and domestic appliances
 Engineering and capital goods
 Gems and jewelry
 Waste management and green technologies
 Renewable energy and solar parks
 Mine-based and wood-based industries 
 Transportation, logistic hub, and inland ports

Special support 

A very low proportion of the population is owned by Scheduled Castes/Scheduled Tribes and women entrepreneurs. Policies like TS-PRIDE shall be implemented to encourage Dalit entrepreneurs.

References

 
 
 

Notes

2014 in Indian economy
Industrial policy
Economy of Telangana
Industry in India